U Turn is a 2016 Indian Kannada-language supernatural thriller film written, produced and directed by Pawan Kumar. It stars Shraddha Srinath in the lead role. Roger Narayan, Dileep Raj and Radhika Chetan feature in supporting roles. The plot revolves around the death of motorists who break a traffic rule at a particular flyover in Bangalore and subsequent pinning down of the culprit by an intern journalist and police inspector duo.

U-Turn was first remade in Malayalam in 2017 as Careful. Director Pawan Kumar remade it into a Telugu-Tamil bilingual in 2018 with the same title - thereby making it the fourth  Kannada movie to be remade in three other South Indian languages after School Master, Sampathige Savaal and Devara Kannu.

The movie was remade in Sinhala in 2019 also titled U Turn  - thereby becoming the second Kannada movie to be remade in Sinhala after Anuraga Aralithu. 

The Filipino remake with the same name was released on pay-to-view basis on 30 October 2020. With that, U Turn became the first Indian movie to be remade in Filipino 

The Bengali remake titled Flyover was released on 2 April 2021. The Hindi remake with the same title  was announced by Ekta Kapoor in July 2021. 

Once that version releases, it will become the third Indian movie to be remade in seven languages after Nuvvostanante Nenoddantana and Anuraga Aralithu. It was the seventh Kannada movie to be remade in a foreign language  and the second Kannada movie to be remade in two foreign languages after Anuraga Aralithu.

Plot 
Rachana (Shraddha Srinath), an intern, with The Indian Express, a daily newspaper, is working on an article on the incidents at a flyover in Bengaluru. She also has a crush on the crime reporter Aditya, whose help she seeks for research material on accidents on the flyover. She finds that each day some motorists move the concrete blocks that partition the road just to take a quick U-turn and avoid the traffic. They don’t move them back and the blocks are left to lie randomly on the road leading to many accidents. A homeless man sitting on the flyover notes down the vehicle numbers of commuters who violate the rule to take the U-turn and gives the list to Rachana. She obtains the details of the culprits using her contact in the traffic department, with the intention of confronting them for their "short-cut" and writing an article for the paper. Her attempt to meet the first person on the list goes in vain.

Later the same day, the police take her into custody and accuse her of killing the same person she wanted to meet. She is shocked and tells her side of the story. Though the senior police officer rejects it, sub-inspector Nayak finds it believable and does some investigation. It is revealed that all the persons Rachana has on her list have committed suicide. They also noticed that they have committed suicide the same day they took the wrong "u-turn". Rachana and Nayak find another number has been noted by the homeless man which is to be delivered to Rachana the next day. The duo trace the address and try to rescue the man, a lawyer, who has taken the u-turn on the same day. As nothing seems suspicious, both leave only to encounter the very death of the lawyer whom they came to rescue.

Later Rachana tries to confront the homeless man for the injuries in the fly-over. Meanwhile, she sees two young men violate the U-Turn and reports it to Nayak. Nayak locks them up in an old Police lock-up to save them. But they start fighting and eventually die under the nose of the police.

With no way of finding the real cause of the death of the culprits, Rachana herself takes the wrong u-turn and waits for something to happen. The one who has been killing the culprits is a woman named Maya, because she and her daughter Aarna died in an accident due to the concrete roadblocks that were moved by the culprits in order to make way for their u-turn. Using her supernatural powers, Maya tries to kill Rachana as well. But Rachana promises to find the person who was responsible for Maya's death. Maya agrees. Rachana, with the help of Nayak, tries to find the person who moved the blocks on the day of Maya's accident. They find out the phone number and address of the guy who moved the block. Rachana writes this on a balloon and leaves it on the flyover for Maya to find. She then invites her boyfriend Aditya for dinner.

During dinner she tries to call the number she found out earlier. It turns out to be Aditya's work mobile number. Devastated she confronts Aditya and informs him that due to his negligence a mother and daughter lost their lives. Aditya says it was not him who made the U-turn. He merely exchanged his bike with his friend. In the final twist, it is revealed that the guy who moved the block was Maya's own husband. Maya's ghost is waiting in Aditya's house to kill him when Maya's husband whom Rachna has informed about the events turns up and explains to Maya that it was because of him that they lost their lives. He then tries to commit suicide by jumping from the balcony. Maya's ghost saves him and tells him that his punishment is to suffer in this world without his wife and daughter.

Cast 

 Shraddha Srinath as Rachana
 Roger Narayan as Sub-inspector Nayak
 Radhika Chetan as Maya
 Dileep Raj as Aditya
 Skanda Ashok as Ritesh
 Krishna Hebbale as Inspector Sudhakar
 Pratibha Nandakumar as lady constable Sarojamma
 Pramod Shetty as Sundar
 Aarna Kulkarni as Aarna
 Chethan D'Souza as Raju
 Kennedi Gopalan as the Homeless flyover man
 Ram Manjjonaath as Police Officer Muddanna
 Rajath Mayee as auto rickshaw driver
 Surya Vasishta as Doctor

Production 
According to the director, the script of the movie took place on the road. He says, "U-Turn happened in July when I used to drop my daughter Lucy to school and traffic used to be high. I used to park in front of her school for more than an hour and used the time to write the script."

"U Turn", which has been made under Pawan Kumar's newly launched banner PK Studios, has Poornachandra Tejaswi's music, Satya Hegde, Advitha Gurumurthy and Siddharth Nuni's cinematography and Suresh's editing. Shraddha Srinath and Dilip Raj, who has done many supporting roles before, are playing the main roles. Roger Narayan, Skanda, Krishna, Pavan, Naveen, Divya, Pramod, Aarna, Kennedy, Chethan D'Souza, Delson D'Souza and others are in the cast.

Reception 
Sunayana Suresh of The Times of India rated the film four out of five, and wrote, "The film can  be read on philosophical and symbolic levels with leitmotifs and what not, but the triumph is that it even appeals to the lay viewer who seeks thrill and entertainment and nothing more." Shyam Prasad S of Bangalore Mirror wrote, "It is what happens post interval that makes or breaks any film. Here, Pawan Kumar takes the easier route and robs U-Turn of becoming a great film." J Hurtado of Screen Anarchy wrote, "Pawan Kumar's U TURN Will Keep You Guessing Until The Last Minute. U-Turn is a film that constantly challenges and defies categorization in the service of telling its own story."

Remakes 
U Turn was remade in Malayalam in 2017 as Careful. It was later remade into a Telugu-Tamil bilingual in 2018  with the same title by Pawan Kumar himself. The film was also officially remade in Sri Lanka in Sinhala in 2019 with the same title. The Filipino remake with the same title was released on 30 October 2020. The film was remade in Bengali as Flyover and released on 2 April 2021. The Hindi remake with the same title  was announced by Ekta Kapoor in July 2021.
The director had revealed that the rights for the Malay language remake were sold out. He also revealed that there are plans to remake the film in Chinese, Thai, Marathi and Gujarati.

References

External source 
 
 

2016 films
2010s Kannada-language films
Indian thriller films
Films set in Bangalore
Films shot in Bangalore
Kannada films remade in other languages
2016 thriller films